The Coronation Stakes is a horse race run at Ascot Racecourse.

Coronation Stakes may also refer to:

Coronation Stakes (greyhounds), a greyhound racing competition between 1928 and 1994
Coronation Stakes, a horse race now known as the Brigadier Gerard Stakes